= Traumatic event =

A traumatic event is an event that is or may be a cause of trauma. The term may refer to one of the following:

- Trauma (medicine), an event associated with a physical trauma
- Psychological trauma, an event associated with a psychological trauma
